Ekers may refer to the following people
Given name
Ekers Raposo (born 1967), Olympic judoka from Dominican Republic

Surname
Henry Archer Ekers (1855–1937), Canadian industrialist and politician
Ronald Ekers (born 1941), Australian radio astronomer

See also
18239 Ekers, a minor planet